Pajala is a type of traditional perahu from western South Sulawesi, Indonesia. It is used mainly for fishing, but in the present it's a Bugis/Makassar name for small to medium-sized boat hull.

Etymology
The name comes from Indonesian/Malay word jala, which means net. The prefix pa- is an equivalent to English suffix -or/-er. Thus the name "pajala" can be translated as "fishing boat that use net".

Description

Pajala is an undecked coasting boat which usually has a tripod mast carrying a single large tanja sail. It is carvel-built, and like other Austronesian boat, it is a double ender (the bow and stern of the boat is sharp, i.e. having stem and sternpost). The bow and stern were similar in shape, usually turn sharply because the board is cut, not bent, into shapes. The pattern of the planks indicates that it was no different from traditional boats from 1000 years ago. The first plank is longer than the keel. The plank is arranged from corner to corner with internal dowels. While mainly deckless, there is a low deck abaft the stempost, behind it is a place for washing. It is built using smooth curved planks, with double quarter rudders, used as a frame and the ribs are placed thereafter.

See also 
Palari
Patorani
Mayang
Benawa

References

Further reading 
 
 Horridge, Adrian (2015). Perahu Layar Tradisional Nusantara. Yogyakarta: Penerbit Ombak. An Indonesian translation of Horridge, Adrian (1985). The Prahu: Traditional Sailing Boat of Indonesia, second edition. Oxford: Oxford University Press.

External links 

 Traditional Boats by Horst Liebner 

Indonesian inventions
Boats of Indonesia
Sailing ships
Sailboat types
Types of fishing vessels
Austronesian ships
Sailboats